The 2022–23 Vegas Golden Knights season is the sixth season for the National Hockey League franchise that started playing in the 2017–18 season.

Standings

Divisional standings

Conference standings

Schedule and results

Preseason
The 2022 preseason schedule was published on July 6, 2022.

Regular season
The regular season schedule was published on July 6, 2022.

Player statistics
Updated to games played March 19, 2023

Skaters

Goaltenders

†Denotes player spent time with another team before joining the Golden Knights. Stats reflect time with the Golden Knights only.
‡Denotes player was traded or waived mid-season. Stats reflect time with the Golden Knights only.
Bold/italics denotes franchise record.

Roster

Transactions
The Golden Knights have been involved in the following transactions during the 2022–23 season.

Trades
* Retained Salary Transaction: Each team is allowed up to three contracts on their payroll where they have retained salary in a trade (i.e. the player no longer plays with Team A due to a trade to Team B, but Team A still retains some salary). Only up to 50% of a player's contract can be kept, and only up to 15% of a team's salary cap can be taken up by retained salary. A contract can only be involved in one of these trades twice.

Players acquired

Players lost

Signings

Draft picks

Below are the Vegas Golden Knights' selections at the 2022 NHL Entry Draft, which was held on July 7 to 8, 2022, at Bell Centre in Montreal.

Notes

References

Vegas Golden Knights seasons
Vegas Golden Knights
Golden Knights
Golden Knights